The Henlow Derby formerly the Bedfordshire Derby was a greyhound racing competition held annually at Henlow Stadium in Stondon, Bedfordshire. 

It was inaugurated in 1984 over 484 metres but switched to 460 metres in 1994. The event was last held in 2018.

Past winners

Distances
1984–1994 (484 metres)
2004–2018 (460 metres)

Sponsors
2015–2017 Racing Post Greyhound TV
2018–2018 Bob Morton honouring Westmead Hawk

References

Greyhound racing competitions in the United Kingdom
Sport in Bedfordshire
Recurring sporting events established in 1984